Aphanochaete is a genus of green algae in the family Aphanochaetaceae.

References

External links

Chaetophorales genera
Chaetophorales